Pelham Civic Complex is a 4,100-seat multi-purpose arena in Pelham, Alabama. It features two NHL size ice skating rinks with a holding capacity of 500 skaters, a skating school, ice skating birthday party rooms, and a multi-purpose banquet area.  Its hockey capacity is 4,100; the arena has  of floor space.

It is the only public ice skating rink in the Birmingham, Alabama area. It also houses several other functions, such as corporate events, conventions, sporting contests, trade shows, and as the home of the SPHL team the Birmingham Bulls.

History 
It was home to the Alabama Slammers ice hockey team, and the Birmingham Bulls starting in 2017. It is now the home of the club teams of the University of Alabama and the University of Alabama-Birmingham.  It is also home to the Pelham Youth Hockey League (PYHL), and hosts the Birmingham area youth travel hockey program (BYHL).

It has previously hosted the Harlem Globetrotters.

In 2016, the rink hosted National Theatre on Ice.

Skating School 
The Pelham Skating School located in the Pelham Civic Complex is attended by 335 students. It is directed by Susie Gray. The program is associated with the United States Figure Skating Association and both hosts and competes in varying competitions. Classes are divided by skill level and each class is led by a skate coach. Private and public lessons are offered year-round.

See also
List of convention centers in the United States

References

External links 
Official Homepage for the Pelham Civic Complex
Official Homepage of the Pelham Youth Hockey League
Homepage of Pelham Panther Travel Hockey

Indoor arenas in Alabama
Sports venues in Alabama
Convention centers in Alabama
Indoor ice hockey venues in Alabama
College ice hockey venues in the United States